is a Ryukyuan gusuku in Nanjō, Okinawa. It is the oldest castle on Okinawa; Chūzan Seikan says it was built by Amamikyu, the creation goddess of the Ryukyuan religion. It was the home of the Aji of Tamagusuku Magiri.

It is located about 700 meters north of Tamagusuku village. The castle is almost a complete ruin and is visited as a sacred grove

References

External links
A youtube video

Castles in Okinawa Prefecture